Hajji Yuseflu-ye Sofla (also Romanized as Ḩājjī Yūseflu-ye Soflá; also known as Ḩājjī Yūsef-e Soflá and Ḩāj Yūsef-e Soflá) is a village in Garmeh-ye Shomali Rural District, Kandovan District, Meyaneh County, East Azerbaijan Province, Iran. At the 2006 census, its population was 59, in 16 families.

References 

Populated places in Meyaneh County